The Journal of Hospital Medicine is a monthly peer-reviewed medical journal covering hospital medicine. It was established in 2006 and is published by the Society of Hospital Medicine, of which it is the official journal. The editor-in-chief is Samir S. Shah (Cincinnati Children's Hospital Medical Center). According to the Journal Citation Reports, the journal has a 2015 impact factor of 2.143.

References

External links

Publications established in 2006
Monthly journals
General medical journals
Academic journals published by learned and professional societies of the United States
English-language journals